Mind and matter may refer to:

Mind and Matter, a 1956 lectures by Erwin Schrödinger
Mind-body dichotomy
Mind & Matter, a 2018 album by Collide
"The Mind and the Matter", a 1961 episode of The Twilight Zone

See also 
 Mind over matter (disambiguation)